In mathematics, two links  and  are concordant if there exists an embedding  such that  and .

By its nature, link concordance is an equivalence relation. It is weaker than isotopy, and stronger than homotopy: isotopy implies concordance implies homotopy.  A link is a slice link if it is concordant to the unlink.

Concordance invariants 
A function of a link that is invariant under concordance is called a concordance invariant.

The linking number of any two components of a link is one of the most elementary concordance invariants.   The signature of a knot is also a concordance invariant. A subtler concordance invariant are the Milnor invariants, and in fact all rational finite type concordance invariants are Milnor invariants and their products, though non-finite type concordance invariants exist.

Higher dimensions 
One can analogously define concordance for any two submanifolds .

This higher-dimensional concordance is a relative form of cobordism – it requires two submanifolds to be not just abstractly cobordant, but "cobordant in N".

See also
Slice knot

References

Further reading
 J. Hillman, Algebraic invariants of links. Series on Knots and everything. Vol 32. World Scientific.
 Livingston, Charles, A survey of classical knot concordance, in: Handbook of knot theory, pp 319–347, Elsevier, Amsterdam, 2005.  

Knot invariants
Manifolds